Papaipema is a genus of moths of the family Noctuidae. The genus was erected by John B. Smith in 1899.

Species
Listed alphabetically:
 Papaipema aerata (Lyman, 1901)
 Papaipema angelica (Smith, 1899) – angelica borer
 Papaipema apicata Dyar, 1912
 Papaipema appassionata (Harvey, 1876) – pitcher plant borer
 Papaipema araliae Bird & Jones, 1921 – aralia shoot borer
 Papaipema arctivorens Hampson, 1910 – northern burdock borer
 Papaipema astuta Bird, 1907 – yellow stoneroot borer
 Papaipema aweme (Lyman, 1908) – aweme borer
 Papaipema baptisiae (Bird, 1902) – indigo stem borer
 Papaipema beeriana Bird, 1923 – (Beer's) blazing star borer
 Papaipema birdi (Dyar, 1908) – umbellifer borer
 Papaipema cataphracta (Grote, 1864) – burdock borer
 Papaipema cerina (Grote, 1874) – golden borer 
 Papaipema cerussata (Grote, 1864) – ironweed borer
 Papaipema circumlucens (Smith, 1899) – hops stalk borer
 Papaipema dribi Barnes & Benjamin, 1926 – rare borer
 Papaipema duovata (Bird, 1902) – seaside goldenrod borer
 Papaipema duplicatus Bird, 1908 (alternative spelling Papaipema duplicata) – dark stoneroot borer
 Papaipema eryngii Bird, 1917 – rattlesnake-master borer
 Papaipema eupatorii (Lyman, 1905) – Joe-Pye-weed borer or eupatorium
 Papaipema furcata (Smith, 1899) – ash tip borer
 Papaipema harrisii (Grote, 1881) – heracleum stem borer
 Papaipema impecuniosa (Grote, 1881) – aster borer
 Papaipema inquaesita (Grote & Robinson, 1868) – sensitive fern borer
 Papaipema insulidens (Bird, 1902) – ragwort stem borer
 Papaipema leucostigma (Harris, 1841) – columbine borer
 Papaipema limata Bird, 1908
 Papaipema limpida (Guenée, 1852) – vernonia borer
 Papaipema lysimachiae Bird, 1914 – loosestrife borer
 Papaipema marginidens (Guenée, 1852) – brick-red borer
 Papaipema maritima Bird, 1909 – giant sunflower borer or maritime borer
 Papaipema nebris (Guenée, 1852) – stalk borer
 Papaipema necopina (Grote, 1876) – sunflower borer
 Papaipema nelita (Strecker, 1898) – coneflower borer
 Papaipema nepheleptena (Dyar, 1908) – turtle head borer
 Papaipema pertincta Dyar, 1920 – groundsel borer
 Papaipema polymniae Bird, 1917 – cup plant borer
 Papaipema pterisii Bird, 1907 – bracken borer
 Papaipema rigida (Grote, 1877) – rigid sunflower borer
 Papaipema rutila (Guenée, 1852) – mayapple borer
 Papaipema sauzalitae (Grote, 1875) – figwort stem borer
 Papaipema sciata Bird, 1908 – Culver's-root borer
 Papaipema silphii Bird, 1915 – silphius borer
 Papaipema speciosissima (Grote & Robinson, 1868) – osmunda borer or regal fern borer
 Papaipema stenocelis (Dyar, 1907) – chain fern borer
 Papaipema sulphurata Bird, 1926 – water-willow stem borer
 Papaipema unimoda (Smith, 1894) – meadow-rue borer 
 Papaipema verona (Smith, 1899) – verona borer

References

 
Apameini